Astroloma pallidum, commonly known as kick bush, is usually a small, compact shrub in the family Ericaceae. The species is endemic to south-western Western Australia.

Description
Astroloma pallidum is usually a neat, dense, compact shrub but sometimes a diffuse to erect shrub to about 30 cm high. Creamy white to pale yellow (rarely pink or red) tubular flowers are present in the axils of leaves for most of the year.

Taxonomy and naming
Astroloma pallidum was first described by Robert Brown in 1810 in Prodromus Florae Novae Hollandiae. The specific epithet (pallidum) is a Latin word meaning "pale" or "wan".

Distribution and habitat
Kick bush grows on yellow/grey sand, red/brown laterite gravel, brown clay to sandy clay, ironstone and limestone in a variety of habitats including flats, hillslopes, winter-wet sites and the edges of lakes in the Avon Wheatbelt, Esperance Plains, Geraldton Sandplains, Jarrah Forest, Mallee, Swan Coastal Plain and Warren biogeographical regions of Western Australia.

Use in horticulture
This species is not known in cultivation, partly because good cutting wood is difficult to obtain.

References

pallidum
Ericales of Australia
Plants described in 1810
Endemic flora of Southwest Australia